Ime Sunday Udoka (born August 9, 1977) is a Nigerian-American professional basketball coach and former player who most recently served as the head coach for the Boston Celtics of the National Basketball Association (NBA). He represented the Nigeria national team during his playing career.

Early life
Udoka was born in Portland, Oregon on August 9, 1977. He attended Portland's Jefferson High School.

College career
Udoka played for Utah State University Eastern and the University of San Francisco before transferring to Portland State University where he starred for the Vikings.

Professional career

Udoka started his professional basketball career by playing in the NBDL with the Charleston Lowgators who drafted him with 39th overall pick in 2002 NBDL Draft. He was called up to play with the Los Angeles Lakers on January 14, 2004, but was later waived. After a stint in Europe, Udoka returned to the United States and once again drafted in NBDL. This time he was drafted third overall by the Fort Worth Flyers in 2005 NBDL Draft. He averaged 17.1 points and 6.2 rebounds per game with the Flyers. On April 6, 2006, Udoka was signed by the New York Knicks. Udoka was waived by the Knicks on September 11, 2006.

Udoka was the last player invited to his hometown Portland Trail Blazers' training camp before the 2006–07 season, getting the invitation only after Aaron Miles failed a physical. Despite the death of his father during the preseason, Udoka impressed the coaching staff with his defensive skills and made the team. After having played in only 12 NBA games in his career, Udoka started in 75 games played in the 2006–07 season. He played 28.6 minutes per game while averaging 8.4 points, 3.7 rebounds, and 0.9 steals.

In 2007, Udoka signed a contract with the San Antonio Spurs. He played in 73 games averaging 5.8 points and 3.1 rebounds in 18 minutes. On his second season with the Spurs, Udoka played in 67 games, and started in three. He averaged 4.3 points and 2.8 rebounds in 15.4 minutes.

Following the 2009 season, Udoka became a free agent, eventually re-signing with the Trail Blazers. He was waived by the Blazers on October 22, 2009, but signed with the Sacramento Kings on November 4, 2009. He played 69 games with the Kings, averaging 3.6 points and 2.8 rebounds in 13.7 minutes.

On November 24, 2010, Udoka rejoined the Spurs, but he was waived on January 5, 2011 after playing only 20 games.

On December 15, 2011, Udoka signed with the New Jersey Nets. However, he was waived on December 23, 2011.

In January 2012, Udoka signed with UCAM Murcia of the Spanish Liga ACB.

Coaching career

San Antonio Spurs (2012–2019)
In August 2012, Udoka joined the San Antonio Spurs as an assistant coach for Gregg Popovich. Udoka would win his first championship as the Spurs defeated the Miami Heat in the 2014 NBA Finals, 4–1.

Udoka was also the key for LaMarcus Aldridge's decision to join the Spurs in 2015. Both Udoka and Aldridge played together with the Trail Blazers during Aldridge's rookie season.

Philadelphia 76ers (2019–2020)
In June 2019, Udoka was hired as an assistant coach of the Philadelphia 76ers. Udoka's head coach on the 76ers, Brett Brown, also coached under Gregg Popovich for the Spurs, and Udoka and Brown were on the same staff in the 2012–13 season.

Brooklyn Nets (2020–2021)
On October 30, 2020, the Brooklyn Nets hired Udoka as an assistant coach.

Boston Celtics (2021–2023)

On June 28, 2021, Udoka was hired as head coach of the Boston Celtics, becoming the fifth head coach of African origin in Boston Celtics history. Though the Celtics began the season 18–21, Udoka led them to a 51–31 record, finishing as the second seed in the Eastern Conference. The Celtics won the Eastern Conference title and made their first NBA Finals appearance since 2010. The Celtics lost in six games to the Golden State Warriors.

On September 22, the Celtics suspended Udoka for the entirety of the 2022–23 season for violations of team policies, pertaining to an improper intimate relationship with a female Celtics staff member. Though the relationship was originally believed by the organization to be consensual, the woman later accused Udoka of making unwanted comments towards her. Udoka issued an apology after the suspension was handed out. He chose not to resign from his position as a result of the violation, though Adrian Wojnarowski reported that Udoka was not guaranteed to stay with the organization following the 2022–23 season. Assistant coach Joe Mazzulla took his place as the interim head coach. On February 16, 2023, Udoka's time with the Celtics came to an end when Mazzulla officially replaced him as the team's permanent head coach.

National team career
Udoka was a player on the Nigerian national team. At the 2006 FIBA World Championships, Udoka led Nigeria in scoring, assists, and steals. Udoka also played for Nigeria in the 2005 and 2011 FIBA Africa Championships, winning a bronze medal in both tournaments.

Udoka has served as an assistant coach for USA Basketball under his Spurs head coach, Gregg Popovich. Udoka's coaching role on the 2019 FIBA World Cup team helped him build relationships with Celtics players Jayson Tatum, Jaylen Brown, and Marcus Smart, who advocated for his hiring as the new Boston head coach. Udoka also coached for Team USA under Popovich at the 2020 Summer Olympics in Tokyo, along with Celtics assistant Will Hardy.

Personal life
Udoka's father was of Nigerian descent, which qualified the younger Udoka for Nigerian citizenship. His older sister, Mfon, played in the WNBA. His mother, who died in late 2011, was an American from Illinois.

In November 2011, Udoka's then-girlfriend, Nia Long, gave birth to their first child. The couple became engaged in May 2015. Long has stated she has no plans to marry.

NBA career statistics

Regular season

|-
| style="text-align:left;"|
| style="text-align:left;"|L.A. Lakers
| 4 || 0 || 7.0 || .333 || .000 || .500 || 1.3 || .5 || .5 || .2 || 2.0
|-
| style="text-align:left;"|
| style="text-align:left;"|New York
| 8 || 0 || 14.3 || .375 || .333 || .500 || 2.1 || .8 || .1 || .0 || 2.8
|-
| style="text-align:left;"|
| style="text-align:left;"|Portland
| 75 || 75 || 28.6 || .461 || .406 || .742 || 3.7 || 1.5 || .9 || .2 || 8.4
|-
| style="text-align:left;"|
| style="text-align:left;"|San Antonio
| 73 || 0 || 18.0 || .424 || .370 || .759 || 3.1 || .9 || .8 || .2 || 5.8
|-
| style="text-align:left;"|
| style="text-align:left;"|San Antonio
| 67 || 3 || 15.4 || .383 || .328 || .609 || 2.8 || .8 || .5 || .2 || 4.3
|-
| style="text-align:left;"|
| style="text-align:left;"|Sacramento
| 69 || 2 || 13.7 || .378 || .286 || .737 || 2.8 || .8 || .5 || .1 || 3.6
|-
| style="text-align:left;"|
| style="text-align:left;"|San Antonio
| 20 || 0 || 6.5 || .238 || .000 || .500 || .9 || .7 || .4 || .0 || .7
|- class="sortbottom"
| style="text-align:center;" colspan="2"|Career
| 316 || 80 || 18.1 || .417 || .356 || .705 || 2.9 || 1.0 || .7 || .2 || 5.2

Playoffs

|-
| style="text-align:left;"|2008
| style="text-align:left;"|San Antonio
| 16 || 0 || 14.8 || .465 || .400 || .714 || 2.9 || 1.1 || .7 || .1 || 5.4
|-
| style="text-align:left;"|2009
| style="text-align:left;"|San Antonio
| 5 || 0 || 20.8 || .350 || .125 || .400 || 4.6 || .8 || .8 || .2 || 3.4
|- class="sortbottom"
| style="text-align:center;" colspan="2"|Career 
| 21 || 0 || 16.2 || .440 || .354 || .583 || 3.3 || 1.0 || .7 || .1 || 5.0

Head coaching record

|-
| style="text-align:left;"|Boston
| style="text-align:left;"|
| 82||51||31|||| style="text-align:left;"|1st in Atlantic||24||14||10||
| style="text-align:center;"|Lost in NBA Finals
|- class="sortbottom"
| style="text-align:center;" colspan="2"|Career
| 82||51||31|||| ||24||14||10||||

References

External links

1977 births
Living people
2006 FIBA World Championship players
African Americans in Oregon
American expatriate basketball people in Argentina
American expatriate basketball people in France
American expatriate basketball people in Spain
American men's basketball players
American sportspeople of Nigerian descent
Basketball coaches from Oregon
Basketball players from Portland, Oregon
Boston Celtics head coaches
Brooklyn Nets assistant coaches
CB Gran Canaria players
CB Murcia players
Charleston Lowgators players
Fort Worth Flyers players
Independiente de General Pico basketball players
JA Vichy players
Jefferson High School (Portland, Oregon) alumni
Junior college men's basketball players in the United States
Liga ACB players
Los Angeles Lakers players
National Basketball Association controversies
New York Knicks players
Nigerian basketball coaches
Nigerian men's basketball players
Philadelphia 76ers assistant coaches
Portland State Vikings men's basketball players
Portland Trail Blazers players
Sacramento Kings players
San Antonio Spurs assistant coaches
San Antonio Spurs players
San Francisco Dons men's basketball players
Small forwards
Sportspeople from Portland, Oregon
Undrafted National Basketball Association players
African-American history of Oregon